Short-chain fatty acids (SCFAs) are fatty acids with fewer than six carbon atoms. Derived from intestinal microbial fermentation of indigestible foods, SCFAs are the main energy source of colonocytes, making them crucial to gastrointestinal health. SCFAs all possess varying degrees of water solubility, which distinguishes them from longer chain fatty acids that are immiscible.

List of SCFAs

Functions

SCFAs are produced when dietary fiber is fermented in the colon. Macronutrient composition (carbohydrate, protein, or fat) of diets affects circulating SCFAs.

Acetate, propionate, and butyrate are the three most common SCFAs.

SCFAs and medium-chain fatty acids are primarily absorbed through the portal vein during lipid digestion, while long-chain fatty acids are packed into chylomicrons, enter lymphatic capillaries, then transfer to the blood at the subclavian vein.

SCFAs have diverse physiological roles in body functions. They can affect the production of lipids, energy and vitamins. They can also affect appetite and cardiometabolic health. Additionally they may have an impact on mental health and mood. The three main SCFAs, acetate, propionate and butyrate, were shown to lower blood pressure in experimental models, and clinical trials to determine their effect on hypertensive patients are underway. Butyrate is particularly important for colon health because it is the primary energy source for colonocytes (the epithelial cells of the colon). The liver can use acetate for energy.

See also 
 List of carboxylic acids
 Medium-chain fatty acid (MCFA), fatty acid with aliphatic tails of 6 to 12 carbons, which can form medium-chain triglycerides
 Long-chain fatty acid (LCFA), fatty acid with aliphatic tails of 13 to 21 carbons
 Very long chain fatty acid (VLCFA), fatty acid with aliphatic tails of 22 or more carbons

References

Further reading 
 A review of the biological properties of SCFA from the Danone Institute via archive.org

Fatty acids